Constricta is a genus of fungi in the family Agaricaceae. This is a monotypic genus, containing the single species Constricta africana.

References

External links
 Index Fungorum

Agaricaceae
Monotypic Agaricales genera